The Mt. Rose  Wilderness is a protected wilderness area in the Carson Range of Washoe County, in the northwesternU.S. state of Nevada.  It is located between Lake Tahoe and Reno, Nevada.

See also 
 Mount Rose Weather Observatory
 Nevada Wilderness Areas
 List of wilderness areas in Nevada
 Mount Houghton
 Relay Peak

External links 
 official Humboldt-Toiyabe National Forest website
 National Atlas: Map of Humboldt-Toiyabe National Forest
 Friends of Nevada Wilderness

Rose Wilderness
Rose Wilderness
Rose Wilderness